James Joseph Shortle (30 March 1883 – 10 September 1945) was an Irish hurler. He was a member of the Wexford team that won the All-Ireland Championship in 1910.

Honours

Wexford
All-Ireland Senior Hurling Championship (1): 1910
Leinster Senior Hurling Championship (1): 1910

References

1883 births
1945 deaths
Castlebridge hurlers
Wexford inter-county hurlers
All-Ireland Senior Hurling Championship winners